Sikkil Kunjumani, (10 June 1927 - 13 November 2010) and Sikkil Neela, (born 9 September 1940), are sisters who play the carnatic flute, called Venu flute. Together they are more famously known as the Sikkil Sisters. Their father Azhiyur Natesa Iyer was a mridangist. Kunjumani started learning music from her father initially and then learnt flute from her maternal uncle Azhiyur Narayanaswami Iyer. Neela learnt flute from her sister Kunjamani. Kunjamani, began giving concerts from the age of nine and Neela from the age of seven. Sikkil Sisters have been giving concerts together since 1962. They are top artistes of the All India Radio and they have been giving hundreds of performances at all the sabhas, television and elsewhere, both within India and abroad. The sisters blend the tone and play on their flutes and the merger is total and the effect remarkable. They are known for the chaste, orthodox style in rendering raga, kriti and swara.

Sikkil Kunjumani died on 13 November 2010, in Chennai, aged 83.  Sikkil Mala Chandrasekar, the daughter of Sikkil Neela, is following her mother's footprints as flautist.

Honours and awards
 Kalaimamani by the Tamil Nadu Sangeetha Nataka Sangam - 1973
 Sangeet Natak Akademi Award - 1989
 Sangeetha Kalasikhamani by The Indian Fine Arts Society, Chennai - 1997
 Sangeetha Kalanidhi - 2002
 Padmashree - 2004

See also

Carnatic Music
Sikkil Mala Chandrasekar

References

External links
 Interview with The Sikkil Sisters – Neela And Kunjumani
 Kutcheribuzz interview with the sisters

Indian flautists
Recipients of the Padma Shri in arts
Venu players
Sangeetha Kalanidhi recipients
Recipients of the Sangeet Natak Akademi Award
Women flautists